Koppa may refer to:

 Koppa (letter), an archaic Greek letter and numeral symbol
 Koppa (Cyrillic), an archaic Cyrillic symbol derived from the Greek
 Koppa, India, a town in Karnataka, India

See also 
 Coppa (disambiguation)
 Copper (disambiguation)
 Koppal (disambiguation)